Henry R. Stanton (August 24, 1920 – March 11, 1975) was an American football player.  He played college football for the Arizona Wildcats football team from 1939 to 1941 and professional football for the New York Yankees from 1946 to 1947.  In 1941, he set two NCAA receiving records with 50 receptions and 820 receiving yards in a single season.  He later served as an ends coach at the University of Arizona, retiring from that position in 1955 to take a job with the sales department of the Arizona Portland Cement Co. in Phoenix.

See also
 List of college football yearly receiving leaders

References

1920 births
1975 deaths
American football ends
Arizona Wildcats football players
Arizona Wildcats football coaches
Players of American football from Texas